TKA is an American freestyle/house music group who were most prominent in the 1980s and early 1990s, particularly in New York City, Chicago, and Miami. Its members originally were Tony Ortiz, Louis "Kayel" Sharpe, and Alex "Aby" Escoto—the original lead singer. Due to tension within the group between Kayel and Aby, the latter was later replaced by Angel "Love" Vasquez, which allowed Kayel to assume the lead vocals. The acronym TKA represents their collective initials. All of TKA's members are of Puerto Rican descent. Many Freestyle fans consider them the kings of that genre, although Kayel seemingly downplayed this label, having jokingly stated "There are no kings in freestyle. There is only one king in it—myself."

History
Hailing from Upper Manhattan, TKA was discovered when it sang at a sweet sixteen party in an East Harlem church in 1984. Record producer and manager Joey Gardner, who attended the party, was impressed with the trio, and, with his help, signed with Tommy Boy Records. The group originally consisted of Tony, Kayel, and Alex Escoto—who was replaced by Angel Vasquez after the release of the single "Tears May Fall".  Although not widely known, India was a member of the group in its earliest days, as well. The group's first single was "One Way Love", a major hit in the Latin club communities of New York, Chicago, and Miami, which was followed by "Come Get My Love". An album was then recorded, titled Scars of Love, which included the first two singles. The title track was then released as a single, followed by "Tears May Fall", "X-Ray Vision", and "Don't Be Afraid".

In 1989, the soundtrack of the film Lean on Me featured the single "You Are the One", which hit #91 on the Billboard Hot 100.

The album Louder Than Love was released in 1990, accompanied by its first single, "I Won't Give Up on You", a slick contemporary R&B groove that was quite a departure from their earlier material, stylistically. 1991 saw even more diversity of sound with the release of the singles "Crash (Have Some Fun)", a house music hit that featured a hip hop vocal by Michelle Visage of the group Seduction; "Give Your Love to Me" produced by Platinum producer Frankie Cutlass  and "Louder Than Love".

That same year the trio also performed the song "Are You For Real" on the popular syndicated television program It's Showtime at the Apollo.

As a result of Freestyle's waning popularity as a new age of music dawned, the trio stopped recording soon after the single "Louder Than Love" was released. A greatest hits package was released in 1992, with a new track, "Maria", which was released as a single.

Following the split, the members of TKA went on to pursue independent interests.  Kayel recorded under the name K7 and had a hit hip-hop album called Swing, Batta, Swing, which contained the hit singles "Zunga Zeng" produced by Platinum Producer Frankie Cutlass (which interpolated and was loosely based on Reggae legend Yellowman's 1983 early Dancehall hit "Zungguzungguguzungguzeng"); "Come, Baby, Come"; and the Cab Calloway-influenced "Hi De Ho". Tony established a production company in New York, and Angel formed the contemporary R&B group Goodfellaz.

The trio got back together in 2001 and recorded the album Forever, which was released by Tommy Boy shortly before that company ended its joint venture with Warner Bros. Records. For the first time in the history of TKA, the release featured Tony's lead vocal on one track (In A Manner Of Speaking) of the album.

Tony, Aby, and Angel performed together as the Original members of TKA, while K7 performed with Tre and Los (from the swing kids) as TKA/K7

In 2020, Aby reunited with K7 and the line up of TKA featuring K7, Tre and Los. Performing for the first time in over 30 years. For the shows, Aby is billed as a solo artist while performing some songs with the group as AKTual voices of TKA. This was later shortened to simply AKtual. K7 and Aby (as AKtual) released a single in August 2021 titled "Don't Forsake Me".

Between 2017 and 2022, TKA has released a flurry of singles on streaming platforms including “Slipping Through My Hands” (2020) and “Spanish Lullaby” (2022).

Discography

Scars of Love (1987)
Louder Than Love (1990)
Greatest Hits (1992)
Forever (2001)
Love Goes On (2016)

See also
 Nuyorican
 Puerto Ricans in New York City

References

External links
 Official website
 Músicas, vídeos, estatísticas e fotos de TKA

American pop music groups
American house music groups
American boy bands
Musical groups established in 1984
Musical groups from New York (state)
American freestyle music groups
Tommy Boy Records artists